Oihan Sancet Tirapu (born 25 April 2000) is a Spanish professional footballer who plays as an attacking midfielder for Athletic Bilbao.

Club career
Born in Pamplona, Navarre, Sancet joined Athletic Bilbao's youth setup from CA Osasuna in 2015. On 18 June 2018, he was called up to pre-season with the first-team by manager Eduardo Berizzo.

Sancet made his senior debut with the reserves on 25 August 2018, starting and opening a 2–0 Segunda División B home win against CD Tudelano. In early September he suffered a knee injury (a tear to his left anterior cruciate ligament), returning to action the following March.

For the 2019–20 season, Sancet was included in the main squad by manager Gaizka Garitano. He made his professional and La Liga debut on 16 August 2019, coming on as a second-half substitute for Óscar de Marcos in the 1–0 home victory over FC Barcelona. On 27 June – his sixth league start – he scored his first goal in a 3–1 defeat of RCD Mallorca also at San Mamés. By December 2020, he had reached sufficient milestones to trigger a €150,000 development payment to Osasuna.

On 3 January 2022, Sancet scored a hat-trick to help his side come from behind at Osasuna to win 3–1. It was the first hat-trick in the league scored by an Athletic player since Aritz Aduriz in 2016, with Sancet the youngest scorer of three in a match for the club since Julen Guerrero in 1994 and the first from Navarre to do so for any club against Osasuna, as well as being the first goals he had scored for the senior team away from Bilbao.

On 3 February 2023, Sancet scored three times in a 4–1 home win over Cádiz CF.

International career
Sancet earned his first cap for Spain at under-21 level on 10 October 2019, in a 1–1 friendly draw with Germany held in Córdoba.

Career statistics

Honours
Athletic Bilbao
Supercopa de España: 2020–21

Spain U18
Mediterranean Games: 2018

References

External links

2000 births
Living people
Spanish footballers
Footballers from Pamplona
Association football midfielders
La Liga players
Segunda División B players
Bilbao Athletic footballers
Athletic Bilbao footballers
Spain youth international footballers
Spain under-21 international footballers
Competitors at the 2018 Mediterranean Games
Mediterranean Games gold medalists for Spain
Mediterranean Games medalists in football